Richard Frank Grein (born November 29, 1932, in Bemidji, Minnesota) was fourteenth bishop of the Episcopal Diocese of New York.

Biography
A graduate of Carleton College and Nashotah House, he was ordained to the diaconate on June 20, 1959, and to the priesthood on December 21, 1959. He served communities in Minnesota and was professor of pastoral theology for two years at Nashotah House. In 1974 he moved to Kansas and became rector of Saint Michael and All Angels church in Mission, Kansas. On February 14, 1981, he was elected Bishop of Kansas at a special diocesan convention that took place in Grace Episcopal Cathedral. He was consecrated bishop on May 22, 1981, by Presiding Bishop John Allin. In 1989 he was elected Bishop of New York and was installed on October 14 of the same year.

Bishop Grein devoted much of his time and energy as Bishop of New York to financial and administrative chores such as Episcopal Charities, the Congregational Support Plan, the Trustees of the Diocese, renewal of the diaconate, and renewal of the priesthood. The Diocese had no endowment fund when he took charge and now has a more than decent endowment. Grein also launched a program to give financial help to congregations too poor to pay their own bills. He always believed that "strong parishes mean a strong diocese."

The bishop fostered a connection with a companion diocese in South Africa. He began an ecclesiastical diplomacy with the Orthodox Church that forged a relationship and made him a trusted liaison. Bishop Grein was named by Ecumenical Patriarch Bartholomew of Istanbul to be an Honorary Metropolitan of the International Throne, a singular honor bestowed on no other bishop. One of his last major public ceremonies was as part of the Episcopal delegation invited to Moscow in 2000. Bishop Grein and Bishop George Packard were the only invited leaders in Western Christendom at the consecration of the newly rebuilt Cathedral of Christ the Savior in Moscow on August 19, 2000.

On April 25, 1998, the Very Rev. Mark S. Sisk was consecrated as Bishop Coadjutor at the Cathedral of Saint John the Divine. For the next two years, Sisk was responsible for the Mid-Hudson Region of the diocese. Bishop Richard Grein announced plans to retire on January 4, 2001. His last appearance in the pulpit of the Cathedral of Saint John the Divine took place on June 24, 2001. The bishop officially retired on June 30, 2001.

External links
MAN IN THE NEWS; Diocese Calls On a Kansan: Richard Frank Grein

Living people
1932 births
People from Bemidji, Minnesota
Nashotah House alumni
Episcopal bishops of Kansas
Carleton College alumni